was daimyō of Tateyama Domain during the late-Edo period Japan.

Biography
Inaba Masamori was the eldest son of the previous daimyō of Tateyama Domain, Inaba Masatake. On the retirement of his father in 1812, he succeeded to the head of the Tateyama Inaba clan and the position of daimyō of Tateyama. However, while assigned to guard duty at Osaka Castle, he fell ill and died. Inaba Masatake was married to a daughter of Honda Tadashige, daimyō of Izumi Domain in Mutsu Province.  His grave is at the sub-temple of Rinshō-in within the grounds of Myōshin-ji in Kyoto.

References 
 Papinot, Edmund. (1906) Dictionnaire d'histoire et de géographie du japon. Tokyo: Librarie Sansaisha...Click link for digitized 1906 Nobiliaire du japon (2003)
 The content of much of this article was derived from that of the corresponding article on Japanese Wikipedia.

Fudai daimyo
1791 births
1820 deaths
Masamori